Alpe D'Huez Airport  is a small altiport serving the town of L'Alpe d'Huez.

References 

Airports in Auvergne-Rhône-Alpes
Isère
Altiports